The 1937 Oklahoma A&M Cowboys football team represented Oklahoma A&M College in the 1937 college football season. This was the 37th year of football at A&M and the second under Ted Cox. The Cowboys played their home games at Lewis Field in Stillwater, Oklahoma. They finished the season 4–6, 2–2 in the Missouri Valley Conference.

Schedule

References

Oklahoma AandM
Oklahoma State Cowboys football seasons
Oklahoma A